Placocheilus caudofasciatus is a species of cyprinid native to Laos, Vietnam and China in eastern Asia.  This species can reach a length of  SL.

References 

Cyprinid fish of Asia
Fish described in 1936
Labeoninae